A referendum on the new constitution of France was held in Gabon on 28 September 1958 as part of a wider referendum held across the French Union. The new constitution would see the country become part of the new French Community if accepted, or result in independence if rejected. It was approved by 92.6% of voters, with a 78.7% turnout.

Results

References

1958 referendums
September 1958 events in Africa
1958
1958 in Gabon